The 1999 World Marathon Cup was the eighth edition of the World Marathon Cup of athletics and were held in Seville, Spain, inside of the 1999 World Championships.

Results

See also
1999 World Championships in Athletics – Men's Marathon
1999 World Championships in Athletics – Women's Marathon

References

External links
 IAAF web site

World Marathon Cup
World
1999 in Spanish sport
Marathons in Spain
International athletics competitions hosted by Spain